Air Hawks is a 1935 American aviation-themed science fiction film based on Ben Pivar's "Air Fury", an unpublished story. Director Albert Rogell who had moved from shorts to B-films, was interested in aviation and had already helmed The Flying Marine (1929) and Air Hostess (1933). In Air Hawks, the studio was able to add an A-list star, Ralph Bellamy, as well as exploiting the fame of record-setting pilot Wiley Post in his only feature film appearance.

Although limited in budget and production values, the introduction of a "death ray" elevated the modest programmer into the science-fiction genre.

Plot
Pilot Barry Eldon (Ralph Bellamy) is the owner of Independent Transcontinental Lines whose airline is in direct competition with Martin Drewen (Robert Middlemass), owner of Consolidated Airlines. With Renee Dupont (Tala Birell), a singer at a nightclub owned by Victor Arnold (Douglas Dumbrille), he believes that his airline's air mail routes will ensure success against his rival.

Arnold decides to ally himself with Drewen who has hired German inventor Shulter (Edward Van Sloan), the inventor of a death ray projector. With this device, they bring down three of Eldon's aircraft. Determined to set a new transcontinental record with Wiley Post flying the racer, Eldon has the help of his girlfriend to eventually expose his rivals and destroy their secret headquarters. A new contract in Washington awaits.

Cast 
 Ralph Bellamy as Barry
 Tala Birell as Renee
 Wiley Post as himself
 Douglas Dumbrille as Arnold
 Robert Allen as Lewis
 Billie Seward as Mona
 Victor Kilian as Tiny
 Robert Middlemass as Drewen
 Geneva Mitchell as Gertie
 Wyrley Birch as Holden
 Edward Van Sloan as Shulter
 Egon Brecher as Leon

Production

Primary photography on Air Hawks took place from February 25 to March 14, 1935. The aerial scenes used a combination of models and full-size aircraft, which included a DH60GM Gipsy Moth, Stearman C-3R, Stinson SM-8A, and Vultee V-1.

Billed as one of the stars of the film, Wiley Post was in the midst of a series of record flights. His actual screen time amounted to little more than a minute.

Between February 22 and June 15, 1935, Post made four attempts to complete the first high altitude non-stop flight from Los Angeles to New York, all of which failed for various mechanical reasons. As the attempts were also meant to be the "First Air Mail Stratosphere Flight" over U.S. Air Mail Route #2 (AM-2) from Los Angeles to New York, Post was in the headlines constantly, an aspect that Columbia wanted to exploit, even creating a marketing campaign featuring his famous "Winnie Mae". The film provides a rare view of a famous pilot on the cusp of tragedy. In mid-1935, after his work on Air Hawks was completed, Post with friend and fellow celebrity Will Rogers set out on another record flight, this time surveying a mail-and-passenger air route from the west coast of the United States to Russia. When the pair were killed on August 15, 1935, near Point Barrow, Alaska, a period of public mourning began.

Reception
Considered along with other aviation films of the era, Air Hawks was a B-film with some aspirations to being elevated to a more prestigious level, especially promoting the appearance of headline-dominating Wiley Post.

A contemporary review in The New York Times, however, noted: "Although Wiley Post is billed as one of the photoplay's chief lures, the aviator completes his chore in about a minute and a half. Air Hawks spends most of its time on the minor side of film entertainment. It belongs in the double-feature programs, for which it has apparently been designed." Largely a forgotten film today, Air Hawks does provide an illuminating, if brief look at an iconic figure of the interwar years.

References

Notes

Citations

Bibliography

 Farmer, James H. Broken Wings: Hollywood's Air Crashes. Missoula, Montana: Pictorial Histories Publishing Co., 1984. .
 Mallan, Lloyd. Suiting Up For Space: The Evolution of the Space Suit. New York: The John Day Company, 1971. .
 Paris, Michael. From the Wright Brothers to Top Gun: Aviation, Nationalism, and Popular Cinema. Manchester, UK: Manchester University Press, 1995. .
 Pendo, Stephen. Aviation in the Cinema. Lanham, Maryland: Scarecrow Press, 1985. .
 Sterling, Bryan and Frances. Forgotten Eagle: Wiley Post: America's Heroic Aviation Pioneer. New York: Carroll & Graf Publishers, 2001. .
 Wynne, Hugh. The Motion Picture Stunt Pilots & Hollywood's Classic Aviation Movies. Missoula, Montana: Pictorial Histories Publishing Co., 1987. .

External links
 
 
 
 
 Air Hawks at TV Guide (1987 write-up was originally published in The Motion Picture Guide)

1935 films
American aviation films
American black-and-white films
Columbia Pictures films
Films scored by Louis Silvers
American science fiction films
1930s science fiction films
1930s English-language films
1930s American films